The Reprint Society, trading as World Books, was a book club in the United Kingdom founded by Alan Bott in 1939 who also started the Book Society, the Avalon Press and Pan Books. The club dominated the middle brow sector of the book club business in the U.K. until it was sold in 1966.

Editorial Board
The initial editorial board included:
Alan Bott
W.A.R. Collins of Collins
A. Dwye Evans of Heinemann
Rupert Hart-Davis of Jonathan Cape
Harold Macmillan of Macmillan
Harold Raymond of Chatto & Windus.

First books
The first six books offered were:
Seven Pillars of Wisdom by T.E. Lawrence
The Joyful Delaneys by Hugh Walpole
The Yearling by Marjorie Kinnan Rawlings
Brazilian Adventure by Peter Fleming
Rabble in Arms by Kenneth Roberts
Possibly the first advert for the club, in The Times, offered Seven Pillars of Wisdom in two volumes for three shillings and six pence (3/6s) per volume, bound in buckram and with a gilt stamped leather title label on the spine. Supplies were described as limited by war-time conditions. A cheaper, cloth-bound, version was available at only 2/6s.

Heyday
The heyday of the club was probably in the 1950s when membership had grown to 200,000 from an initial 2,000 and reducing costs enabled the reintroduction of the signature buckram bindings for which the club was known. The club boasted in its advertising that it was the largest in the British Commonwealth.

Sale
In 1966, firm was acquired by W.H. Smith and Doubleday and renamed Book Club Associates which traded using a number of different club names. The Reprint Society was described at the time by its Managing Director, Tony Barrett, as being a company serving the "broad brow" reader rather than the "high brow" reached by The Readers Union or the middle or lower brow reached by other clubs.

References

1939 establishments in the United Kingdom
Book clubs